Cerkev sv. Trojice or cerkev svete Trojice, Slovene for Holy Trinity Church, may refer to:

 Ursuline Church of the Holy Trinity, Ljubljana
 Holy Trinity Church, Hrastovlje, southwestern Slovenia